The 1921 Bowling Green Normals football team was an American football team that represented Bowling Green State Normal School (later Bowling Green State University) as a member of the Northwest Ohio League (NOL) during the 1921 college football season. In its third season of intercollegiate football, Bowling Green compiled a 3–1–1 record and outscored opponents by a total of 178 to 34. Earl Krieger was the head coach, and Franklin "Gus" Skibbie was the team captain.

The team scored 151 points against , the highest total of the 1921 season by any football team in the country.

Schedule

References

Bowling Green
Bowling Green Falcons football seasons
Northwest Ohio League football champion seasons
Bowling Green Normals football